This is a list of books in the field of religious apologetics.

Buddhism
 Dharmasiri, Gunapala. 1988. A Buddhist Critique of the Christian Concept of God. Golden Leaves Publishing, Antioch, California.
 De Silva, A. L. 1994. Beyond Belief: A Buddhist Critique of Fundamentalist Christianity. Three Gem Publications, Camperdown, Sydney, Australia.
 Thelle, Notto R. 1987. Buddhism and Christianity in Japan: From Conflict to Dialogue, 1854-1899. University of Hawaii Press, Honolulu.
 Young, Richard Fox., and G.P.V. Somaratna. 1996. Vain Debates. The Buddhist-Christian Controversies of Nineteenth-Century Ceylon. Publications of the De Nobili Research Library, Vienna, Austria.

Christianity

 Geisler, Norman L., and Ronald M. Brooks. 1990. When Skeptics Ask: A Handbook of Christian Evidences. Victor Books, Wheaton, Illinois.
 Geisler, Norman L. and Frank Turek. 2004. 'I Don't Have Enough Faith to be an Atheist'. Crossway Books, Wheaton, Illinois.
 Conway, Bertrand L. 1929. The Question Box: Replies to Questions Received on Missions to Non-Catholics. New ed. Paulist Press, New York.
 Gore, Charles, Bp. 1889. Roman Catholic Claims. Rivingtons, London.
 Kreeft, Peter. 1982. Between Heaven and Hell: A Dialog Somewhere Beyond Death with John F. Kennedy, C.S. Lewis and Aldous Huxley. InterVarsity Press, Downers Grove, Illinois.
 Lewis, C. S. [1940] 1957. The Problem of Pain. Fontana, Glasgow.
 Lewis, C. S. [1947] 1960. Miracles: A Preliminary Study. Fontana, Glasgow.
 Lewis, C. S. [1952] 1955. Mere Christianity. Fontana, Glasgow.
 Little, Paul E. 1968. Know Why You Believe. InterVarsity Press, Downers Grove. 
 McDowell, Josh. 1979. Evidence That Demands A Verdict. Revised Edition. Here's Life Publishers, San Bernardino, California.
 McDowell, Josh. 1981. The Resurrection Factor. Here's Life Publishers, San Bernardino, California.
 McDowell, Josh., and Don Stewart. 1980. Answers to Tough Questions Skeptics Ask About the Christian Faith. Here's Life Publishers, San Bernardino, California.
 Montgomery, John Warwick. 2002. History, Law and Christianity. Canadian Institute for Law, Theology & Public Policy, Edmonton, Alberta. 
 Montgomery, John Warwick. 2003. Tractatus Logico-Theologicus. Verlag für Kultur und Wissenschaft/Culture and Science Publishers. 
 Philip, Johnson, 2003. Christian Apologetics: A Comprehensive Textbook. Wise Men Books, Kochi, India. Online English Version
 Richardson, Alan, Christian apologetics, London, S.C.M. Press, 1947.
 Schaeffer, Francis A. 1982. The Complete Works of Francis Schaeffer. 5 Volumes. Crossway Books, Westchester, Illinois.
 Strobel, Lee. 1998. The Case for Christ: A Journalist's Personal Investigation of the Evidence for Jesus. Zondervan, Grand Rapids, Michigan.
 Turek, Frank. 2014. 'Stealing from God: why atheists need God to make their case' NavPress, Colorado Springs, CO.
 Keller, Timothy. 2008 "The Reason for God"
Douglas, Scott, 2016. OrganicJesus: Finding Your Way to an Unprocessed, Gmo-free Christianity. Kregel Publications, Grand Rapids, Michigan.

Mormonism
 McDonald, A. Melvin. 1963. The Day of Defense. Rev. ed. Sandy, Utah: Sounds of Zion, 1994, cop. 1963. N.B.: One of numerous editions and printings of this work.

Hinduism 
 Shri-hindu-dharma-sthapana (1831)
 Svadesha-dharmabhimani (1834)
 Works written in response to Mata-parīkṣā:
 Mata-parīkṣā-śikṣā (1839) by Somanātha, apparently a pseudonym for Subaji Bapu
 Mataparīkṣottara (1840) by Harachandra Tarkapanchanan
 Śāstra-tattva-vinirṇaya (1844-1845) by Nilakantha Goreh
 Swamikal, Chattambi. 1890 (approx). A Hindu Critique of Christianity. English translation of Krista Mata Chedanam.

Islam

 Bucaille, Maurice, 1993. The Bible, The Qur'an and Science: The Holy Scriptures examined in the Light of Modern Knowledge. Taj Publications, Delhi, India.
 Leirvik, Oddbjørn. 2001. "History as a Literary Weapon: The Gospel of Barnabas in Muslim-Christian Polemics." Studia Theologica 54: 4-26.
 Watt, William Montgomery. 1991. Muslim-Christian Encounters: Perceptions and Misperceptions. Routledge, London & New York.
 Westerlund, David. 2003. "Ahmed Deedat's Theology of Religion: Apologetics Through Polemics." Journal of Religion in Africa 33 (3):263-278.

Neopaganism
 DiZerega, Gus. 2001. Pagans and Christians: The Personal Spiritual Experience. Llewellyn Publications, St. Paul, Minnesota.

See also 
 Bibliography of books critical of Christianity
 Bibliography of books critical of Islam
 Bibliography of books critical of Judaism
 Bibliography of books critical of Mormonism
 Bibliography of books critical of Scientology

References 

Religion-related lists
Religious bibliographies
Lists of books about religion